Amarildo Luis de Souza (born January 12, 1976) is a Brazilian footballer that previously played for Semarang United in the Liga Primer Indonesia.

References

External links

1976 births
Living people
Association football midfielders
Brazilian footballers
Brazilian expatriate footballers
Brazilian expatriate sportspeople in Indonesia
Expatriate footballers in Indonesia
Liga 1 (Indonesia) players
Persijap Jepara players
Persik Kediri players